Jonathan Albon (born 19 April 1989) is a British sky runner and obstacle course racer who has won three Skyrunner World Series.

Biography
Originally from Great Dunmow in Essex, Albon later moved to live in Bergen, Norway.

He twice won the final ranking of Sky Extreme (2016 and 2017) and has once been the overall winner of the Skyrunner World Series. As an obstacle racer, he has won the Adventurey world championships in 2014, 2015, 2016, 2017, 2018 and 2019. He has also won the Spartan World Championships in 2014 and 2018.

Albon won the Trail World Championships in 2019.

In 2021 Albon won the OCC at Ultra-Trail du Mont-Blanc.

2017 SWS Victory
Overall race by race.

References

External links
 
 

1989 births
Living people
Sportspeople from Essex
British sky runners
People from Great Dunmow
Skyrunning World Championships winners
British male long-distance runners
IAU Trail World Championships winners